John P. Rogan was an archaeologist. Working under Cyrus Thomas in the early 1880s, Rogan conducted the first archaeological excavations on the Etowah Indian Mounds, near Cartersville, Georgia, for the Smithsonian Institution. A91117 and A91113 in the collections of the Department of Anthropology, National Museum of Natural History, Smithsonian Institution). Rogan tested seven other archaeological sites in Georgia in Bartow, White, Habersham, Forsyth, Rabun, Elbert, and McIntosh counties. He resigned in 1886 to work in the mercantile business in Bristol, Tennessee.

References

Cyrus Thomas: 1894 Report on Mound Explorations in Eastern United States.

American archaeologists
Year of birth unknown
Year of death unknown